Moolan is a town and union council of Hyderabad District in the Sindh province of Pakistan. It is part of the rural Taluka of Hyderabad.

References

Union councils of Sindh
Populated places in Hyderabad District, Pakistan